Street Acquaintances is a 1948 German drama film directed by Peter Pewas and starring Gisela Trowe, Alice Treff and Ursula Voß. It was made by the Communist-controlled DEFA studios in the Soviet Zone of Germany Released in both the future West and East Germany it was a popular hit and sold 6,469,626 tickets. While it can be regarded as using a style that resembled the Italian neorealist films of the era, it has also been suggested that it returns to the more traditional style of the Weimar era. It portrays the dangers of spreading venereal disease.

It was shot at the Babelsberg Studios in Berlin and on location around the city. The film's sets were designed by the art director Wilhelm Depenau.

Cast
 Gisela Trowe as Erika
 Alice Treff as Annemie
 Ursula Voß as Marion
 Siegmar Schneider as Walter Helbig
 Harry Hindemith as Herbert Petzoldt
 Hans Klering as Peter
 Ursula Friese as Else
 Arno Paulsen as Elses Freund
 Gertrud Boll as Olly Gebauer
 Eduard Wandrey as Spitz
 Ursula Krieg as Frau Möbius
 Herwart Grosse as Arzt im Gesundheitsamt
 Agnes Windeck as Krankenschwester
 Marlise Ludwig as Erikas Mutter
 Eduard Wenck as Nachbar im Treppenhaus
 Lotte Loebinger
 Arthur Wiesner as Erikas Vater
 Walter Werner as Redakteur
 Karl Hannemann as Schieber
 Monika Bode as Ärztin im Chefarztzimmer
 Peter Elsholtz as Marions Freund
 Ernst Rotmund as Unangenehmer Zeitgenosse
 Karin Evans as Ärztin im Gesundheitsamt
 Ursula Kolmetz
 Otto Matthies as Nervöser Herr
 Werner Pledath as Praktischer Arzt
 Otto Brahn
 Axel Triebel as Ein alter Major
 Ellen Ysenta
 Werner Segtrop

References

Bibliography
 Martina Moeller. Rubble, Ruins and Romanticism: Visual Style, Narration and Identity in German Post-War Cinema. 2014.

External links
 

1948 films
1948 drama films
German drama films
East German films
1940s German-language films
Films directed by Peter Pewas
Films set in Berlin
German black-and-white films
Films shot at Babelsberg Studios
1940s German films